Class attribute may refer to:

Class attribute (HTML), an HTML attribute which is a feature of many HTML and XHTML elements, typically to identify them for styles
Class attributes (computer programming), defining the structure of a class

See also 
Pseudo-class, in Cascading Style Sheets
Span and div, practical usage of the HTML attribute
Class (disambiguation)